Hebei University is a provincial public university in Baoding, Hebei, China. 

The university has an estimated student population of 33,000, including 6,100 full-time postgraduates and 26,900 full-time undergraduates.

History

The university was founded in 1921 as the "Institut des Hautes Études et Commerciales des Tientsin" by French Jesuits in Tianjin. The next four decades saw the university significantly changed, during which it was known by the names of Tsin Ku University, Tianjin Normal College, and Tianjin Normal University, respectively. In 1960, the university was reformed as a comprehensive University and renamed as Hebei University. In 1970, three years after Tianjin was designated as an autonomous municipality, which rendered it outside of the jurisdiction of Hebei province, the university was moved to Baoding.

Campus

The University library has a collection of 3,900,000 books and 5,000 periodicals. It has one of the largest collections of rare books among Chinese universities. The University museum houses more than 8,000 objects, over 70 of which are designated as national treasures and protected by law. The museum also possesses some rare specimens of animals and plants.

Curriculum

As a comprehensive university, Hebei University offers a variety of courses covering a wide range of fields, including Philosophy, Economics, Law, Education, Literature, History, Science and Technology, Engineering, Medicine, and Management. The 15 colleges offer 85 specialized undergraduate courses leading to bachelor's degrees. The university can also award master's degrees in 140 subjects and doctorates in 12 fields.

Rankings
Hebei University consistently ranks one of the top two universities in Hebei Province on a variety of criteria and is consistently ranked top 80 in China.

The Chinese University Ranking (Wu Shulian) rankings by year:

Notable Faculty Members

The university has a total of 3,372 teaching and administrative staff, of whom 1,910 are doing teaching and research work, including 417 professors and 722 associate professors.

 Among them, professor Yin Xiangchu, a member of Chinese Academy of Sciences, takes the lead in the systematic study of the locust and his work entitled, The Habitat of the Locust Order and a Bibliography of References, is considered the most exclusive and systematic in this field.
 Prof. Song Daxiang, is a specialist in the study of spiders in China and the author of The Arachnids of China. He is acclaimed as the chief scholar in his field.
 Professor Wei Chunjiang, a distinguished microbiologist, is considered to be the authority on the study of lichen by his fellow scholars at home and abroad.
 In addition, the study of the Song Dynasty, headed by Professor Qi Xia, is among the best in China. Qi's work, 'The Economic History of the Song Dynasty, lays the cornerstone for the study of economy in ancient China.
 The study of the international history of education is led by Professor Teng Dachun, has contributed enormously to works in this field. Teng's book, The History of Education in the United States, is one of the most important achievements in this field.

References

External links
Official website
Official English Website
Webpage, China Scholarship Council.

 
Universities and colleges in Hebei
Educational institutions established in 1921
1921 establishments in China